Jon Brooks (born 1968) is a Canadian folk singer-songwriter.

Jonathan or Jon Brooks may also refer to:
Jon Brooks (American football) (born 1957), American football linebacker
Jonathan Brooks (priest) (1774–1855), Archdeacon of Liverpool
Jon Brooks, British musician who performs as The Advisory Circle, Georges Vert, and King of Woolworths
Mandy Brooks (Jonathan Joseph Brooks, 1897–1962), American baseball player
Jonathan Brooks, director of Imagination Station Science Museum

See also
Jonathan Brooks House, a historic house in Medford, Massachusetts
Jon Brookes (died 2013), English drummer of The Charlatans
John Brookes (disambiguation)
John Brooks (disambiguation)